MUIS is an abbreviation for:

Majlis Ugama Islam Singapura
Mongol Ulsyn Ikh Surguuli, The National University of Mongolia

See also
Muis